Robert Olejnik (9 March 1911 – 29 October 1988) was a Luftwaffe flying ace of World War II. He was credited with 41 aerial victories claimed in some 680 combat missions. He was also a recipient of the Knight's Cross of the Iron Cross. The Knight's Cross of the Iron Cross was awarded to recognise extreme battlefield bravery or successful military leadership.

Awards
 Iron Cross (1939)
 2nd Class (17 September 1940)
 1st Class (21 September 1940)
 Ehrenpokal der Luftwaffe (18 July 1941)
 Front Flying Clasp of the Luftwaffe for fighter pilots in Gold (5 May 1941)
 Knight's Cross of the Iron Cross on 27 July 1941 as Oberleutnant and Staffelkapitän of the 4./JG 1

Notes

References

Citations

Bibliography

 
 
 
 

1911 births
1988 deaths
Military personnel from Essen
Luftwaffe pilots
German World War II flying aces
Recipients of the Knight's Cross of the Iron Cross
People from the Rhine Province